Chalcophyllite is a rare secondary copper arsenate mineral occurring in the oxidized zones of some arsenic-bearing copper deposits. It was first described from material collected in Germany.  At one time chalcophyllite from Wheal Tamar in Cornwall, England, was called tamarite, but this name is now discredited (not to be confused with the amphibole mineral taramite, which is quite different). At Wheal Gorland a specimen exhibiting partial replacement of liriconite, by chalcophyllite has been found.  The mineral is named from the Greek, chalco "copper" and fyllon, "leaf", in allusion to its composition and platy structure.  It is a classic Cornish mineral that can be confused with tabular spangolite.

Formula
The difference reflects the fact that the water content varies at room temperature based on relative humidity.

Unit cell
Some authors choose a unit cell with three formula units per cell (Z=3), and some a smaller unit cell with only 1.5 formula units per cell (Z=1.5). For the larger unit cell a = 10.77 Å, c = 57.5 Å, Z=3. For the smaller unit cell c is only half as long, a = 10.756 Å, c = 28.678 Å, Z = 1.5.

Crystal habit
Crystals are platy, six-sided and flattened perpendicular to the c crystal axis, and may be striated triangularly on these flattened faces.  It may form rosettes, or be drusy, foliated or massive.

Physical properties

Cleavage is perfect perpendicular to the c crystal axis, and twinning occurs with {1010} as the twin plane. Fracture is irregular.  The mineral is soft, with hardness only 2, the same as gypsum.  Specific gravity is generally given in the range 2.67 to 2.69, but Webmineral has 2.4 to 2.66. Chalcophyllite is soluble in acids and in ammonia.  It is not fluorescent, nor radioactive. The water content varies at room temperature based on relative humidity.  Chalcophyllite alters to chrysocolla, which is a copper-aluminium silicate with the formula .

Optical properties
Many copper minerals are blue or green in color; chalcophyllite is blue-green to emerald-green, with a pale green streak and vitreous to subadamantine luster, pearly on {0001}.  Crystals are transparent to translucent.  It is uniaxial (-) with refractive indices nω = 1.618 to 1.632 and nε = 1.552 to 1.575.  Indices of refraction vary markedly depending on the relative humidity since the water content varies at ambient temperature.  It is pleochroic with O blue-green and E almost colorless.

Environment
Chalcophyllite is an uncommon secondary mineral occurring in the oxidized zones of some arsenic-bearing hydrothermal copper deposits. Associated minerals include azurite, malachite, brochantite, chrysocolla, spangolite, connellite, cuprite, cyanotrichite, strashimirite, parnauite, lavendulan, cornubite, langite, clinoclase, pharmacosiderite and mansfieldite.  The type material is conserved at the Mining Academy, Freiberg, Germany.  Notable occurrences include the Majuba Hill Mine, Antelope District, Nevada, US and Cornwall, including Wheal Gorland, UK.

See also
List of minerals

References

External links

Crystal structure of Chalcophyllite

Arsenate minerals
Copper(II) minerals
Trigonal minerals
Minerals in space group 148